Frank Charles Hodges (26 January 1891 – 5 June 1985) was an English footballer. His regular position was as a forward. He was born in Nechells, Birmingham. He played League football for Birmingham, Manchester United, Wigan Borough and Crewe Alexandra, and also made wartime guest appearances for St Mirren.

References

External links
Profile at StretfordEnd.co.uk

1891 births
1985 deaths
Footballers from Birmingham, West Midlands
English footballers
Association football outside forwards
Birmingham City F.C. players
Manchester United F.C. players
Wigan Borough F.C. players
Crewe Alexandra F.C. players
Stalybridge Celtic F.C. players
Sandbach Ramblers F.C. players
Manchester North End F.C. players
English Football League players
St Mirren F.C. wartime guest players